Qieyang Shijie (Amdo Tibetan language: [tɕʰeɣjaŋ ʂcəl]; born 11 November 1990), also known as Qieyang Shenjie or Choeyang Kyi; is a Chinese race walker. She was born in Haiyan, Haibei T.A.P, Qinghai province, and her family are Tibetan herders. She won gold medal in the Women's 20 km walk race in 2012 Summer Olympics in London.  She is the first ethnic Tibetan to compete and win a medal in the Olympics. After winning the medal, Qieyang Shijie said she was most grateful to her coach. Originally she won a bronze medal, but after Russia's Olga Kaniskina was disqualified in March 2016 for doping, she was awarded the silver medal, and with the subsequent disqualification of Elena Lashmanova she was promoted to gold.  She also finished in 5th place at the 2016 Summer Olympics. Qieyang Shijie finished 7th at 2020 Summer Olympics.

She was selected into the Qinghai Team in April 2008 by Yuan Dejiu, the major coach of the team who found her speciality when let accompany someone other to run and gave her her nickname "little tokyi". In June 2010, she was selected by Zhang Fuxin, who later became her coach, into the National Team.

See also
Athletics at the 2012 Summer Olympics – Women's 20 kilometres walk
Athletics at the 2016 Summer Olympics – Women's 20 kilometres walk
Athletics at the 2020 Summer Olympics – Women's 20 kilometres walk

References

External links

1990 births
Living people
Chinese female racewalkers
Athletes (track and field) at the 2012 Summer Olympics
Athletes (track and field) at the 2016 Summer Olympics
Athletes (track and field) at the 2020 Summer Olympics
Athletes (track and field) at the 2018 Asian Games
Athletes from Qinghai
Medalists at the 2012 Summer Olympics
Olympic athletes of China
People from Haibei
Athletes from Tibet
Olympic gold medalists in athletics (track and field)
Asian Games silver medalists for China
Medalists at the 2018 Asian Games
Asian Games medalists in athletics (track and field)
World Athletics Championships athletes for China
World Athletics Championships medalists
Olympic gold medalists for China